Turkey bowling is a sport which is based on ordinary bowling. A frozen turkey serves as the bowling ball and 10 liquid-filled plastic beverage bottles are used for bowling pins. The turkey is bowled down a smooth surface such as ice or a soap-covered sheet of painters plastic. The sport is commonly associated with Thanksgiving.

Turkey bowling is popular in minor league ice hockey in the United States and Canada.

The original variant involves turkey bowling in an aisle of a grocery store. A Derrick Johnson claims to have invented turkey bowling in 1988 when he worked as a grocery clerk at a Newport Beach Lucky's branch while observing a manager slide a frozen turkey across the floor and accidentally topple a soda bottle.

Derrick became a self-appointed commissioner of the "Poultry Bowlers Association" and codified the rules and terminology, such as "the fowl line" (cf. "foul line"), "the gobbler" (three strikes in a row; cf. turkey (bowling)), "the Butterball" (a gutterball) and "the wishbone" (a 7-10 split).

Notable occurrences
Turkey bowling was featured in the 1995 novel Bloodsucking Fiends: A Love Story  by Christopher Moore, where it was the favorite sport of "The Animals", a wild group of night grocery stockers (continued in the sequels You Suck: A Love Story and Bite Me).

Episode 14 of 10 Items or Less TV series was "Turkey Bowling". This idea for this episode was given to John Lehr by David Howell, an aspiring comedy writer.
  
The Guy's Grocery Games episode "Frozen Food Fight" featured a round where two contestants bowled a frozen turkey at nine soda bottles; the combined number knocked down was the number of non-frozen items each was allowed to use in their next dish.

Every Thanksgiving morning, Cleveland, Ohio Fox affiliate WJW-TV does its annual Turkey Bowl. The WJW version of turkey bowling uses 15 cans of canned cranberry sauce, stacked in a pyramid shape, and uses a one-bowl-per-round knockout tournament format. In the 2010 edition, it was hosted by morning features and man about town reporter Kenny Crumpton and morning meteorologist Angelica Campos. In WJW-TV's version, people win prizes anything ranging from Giant Eagle Gift Cards to monetary prizes. The contest is broadcast on WJW live and streamed around the world on WJW's Web site, with the contests taking up the full closing segment (around 7 minutes) of each half-hour of WJW's morning newscast. The broadcast began in 1999. From then until 2019, the event was traditionally held at a Giant Eagle somewhere in Cuyahoga County; the 2021 contest was held in a garage.

Controversy
Animal rights proponents, who oppose the use of animals in sports, claim that turkey bowling is disrespectful to animals and sends mixed messages which may encourage violence to animals or people.  Another objection is perceived disrespect to the central attribute of Thanksgiving.    In 2003, an upcoming event for the title of UK Great Turkey Bowling Champion at Manchester Evening News Arena was protested against by animal rights campaigners; as a result, plastic turkeys were used instead of real frozen turkeys. In 2007 an animal sanctuary rescued a live turkey, which was in a cage, from a turkey bowling event in New York State.

References

Winter sports
Sports entertainment
Bowling
Humour
Thanksgiving television specials
Meleagris